Witthöft is a German surname. Notable people with the surname include:

Carina Witthöft (born 1995), German tennis player
Joachim Witthöft (1887–1966), German general

German-language surnames